Billion is a word for a large number, and it has two distinct definitions:
This is its only current meaning in English.
This number, which is one thousand times larger than the short scale billion, is now referred to in English as one trillion. However, this number is the historical meaning in English for the word "billion" (with the exception of the United States), a meaning which was still in official use in British English until some time after World War II.

American English adopted the short scale definition from the French (it enjoyed usage in France at the time, alongside the long-scale definition). The United Kingdom used the long scale billion until 1974, when the government officially switched to the short scale, but since the 1950s the short scale had already been increasingly used in technical writing and journalism. 

Other countries use the word billion (or words cognate to it) to denote either the long scale or short scale billion. 

Milliard, another term for one thousand million, is extremely rare in English, but words similar to it are very common in other European languages. For example, Bosnian, Bulgarian, Catalan, Croatian, Czech, Danish, Dutch, Finnish, French, Georgian, German, Hebrew (Asia), Hungarian, Italian, Kazakh, Kyrgyz, Lithuanian, Luxembourgish, Norwegian, Persian, Polish, Portuguese, Romanian, Russian, Serbian, Slovak, Slovene, Spanish (although the expression mil millones — a thousand million — is far more common), Swedish, Tajik, Turkish, Ukrainian and Uzbek — use milliard, or a related word, for the short scale billion, and billion (or a related word) for the long scale billion. Thus for these languages billion is a thousand times larger than the modern English billion.

History

According to the Oxford English Dictionary, the word billion was formed in the 16th century (from million and the prefix bi-, "two"), meaning the second power of a million (1,000,0002 = ). This long scale definition was similarly applied to trillion, quadrillion and so on. The words were originally Latin, and entered English around the end of the 17th century. Later, French arithmeticians changed the words' meanings, adopting the short scale definition whereby three zeros rather than six were added at each step, so a billion came to denote a thousand million, a trillion became a million million, and so on. This new convention was adopted in the United States in the 19th century, but Britain retained the original long scale use. France, in turn, reverted to the long scale in 1948.

In Britain, however, under the influence of American usage, the short scale came to be increasingly used. In 1974, Prime Minister Harold Wilson confirmed that the government would use the word billion only in its short scale meaning (one thousand million). In a written answer to Robin Maxwell-Hyslop MP, who asked whether official usage would conform to the traditional British meaning of a million million, Wilson stated: "No. The word 'billion' is now used internationally to mean 1,000 million and it would be confusing if British Ministers were to use it in any other sense. I accept that it could still be interpreted in this country as 1 million million and I shall ask my colleagues to ensure that, if they do use it, there should be no ambiguity as to its meaning."

See also

 Names of large numbers

References

Large numbers